The Bravery Council of Australia Meeting 71 Honours List was announced by the Governor General of Australia on 17 August 2009.

Awards were announced for 
the Star of Courage,
the Bravery Medal,
Commendation for Brave Conduct and
Group Bravery Citation.

† indicates an award made posthumously.

Star of Courage

Joanne Margaretha Lucas, Western Australia

Bravery Medal (BM)

Joshua William Dishton, Victoria
Jack Ross Foster, Victoria
Dion Grey, Victoria
Jason Graeme Gully†, Victoria
Moomooga Tiatia Harris, Victoria
Daniel Chan Johnson, Queensland
Jacqueline Johnson, Queensland
Petty Officer Greg James Langshaw, Western Australia
Constable Paul Thomas Mason, Queensland Police
Chief Petty Officer Rohan Kenneth Pugh, Western Australia
Kyle George Quinlan, Queensland
Allan Farley Small, Victoria
Paul Richard Udinga, Western Australia
Xinkang Wang, New South Wales
John Macleay West, Queensland
Jeanette Margaret Wilkins, New South Wales
David Kevin Williams, South Australia

Commendation for Brave Conduct

Stewart John Atchinson, Victoria
David John Bevan-Evans, Victoria
Alfred Boge, Solomon Islands
Steven Feruccio Brescacin, Western Australia
Kent Francis Brotherton, Victoria
Leslie Ross Burnley, Western Australia
Pascal Cabooter, Belgium
Sean Cavanagh, Queensland
Mary Margaret Cosh, Queensland
Maureen May Crawford, New South Wales
Kenneth Sydney Dacomb, Victoria
Ricky James Dare, Queensland
Cossie John Doyle, Queensland
Neale Michael Dunphy , Queensland
Paul David Eustance, Northern Territory
Mathew John Froude, Queensland
Senior Constable Ian Frederick Goeths, Queensland Police
Steven Lance Gunster, Western Australia
Paul Christopher Harrington, South Australia
Paul James Heenan, Queensland
Robert Hirsch, Queensland
Glen Phillip Ingram, Victoria
Bradley John Kidd, Queensland
John Gerard Kilduff, Victoria
Sergeant Damion Clifford King, Northern Territory
David Anthony King, Western Australia
Steven Kladaric, Victoria
Eugene Terrence Kudray, Western Australia
Benjamin McGuire, Queensland
Benjamin Thomas Marion, Queensland
Senior Constable Andrew James Mayfield, New South Wales Police
Levi Perry, Western Australia
Ross Edward Pittit, Queensland
James Martin Regan†, Western Australia
Clancy Jade Roberts, New South Wales
Michael William Russel, Queensland
Piero Sidoti, Victoria
Shawn Scott Thornton, New South Wales
Senior Constable Richard Paul Wells, Western Australia Police

Group Bravery Citation
Awardees are several crew members from the 35 Water Transport Squadron attached to the Australian National Antarctic Research Expedition.
Kenneth Stanley Barrington, New South Wales
Dudley Raymond Crowe, Victoria
Timothy Gay, Queensland
Gregory Dale Kenny, New South Wales
Alistair Andrew Scott, Queensland

References

Orders, decorations, and medals of Australia
2009 awards